The Definitive Performances (1963–1987) is an anthology of performances by Smokey Robinson & the Miracles. It was produced by Reelin' in the Years Productions and the Universal Music Group International, in conjunction with Motown. In addition to the musical performances, this DVD also features the first - ever in depth interview with original Miracles members Smokey Robinson, Bobby Rogers, and Pete Moore. Strangely, original members Marv Tarplin & Claudette Robinson are not present, but are mentioned throughout the disc. (Original member Ronnie White is now deceased.) The disc also features 2 hit songs by the group featuring Smokey's replacement, Billy Griffin, and three of Smokey's Post- Miracles solo hits. During the interview, the three Miracles discuss the history of the group, the formation of Motown, and detailed stories behind the creation of some of their greatest hits. According to David Peck, producer of the disk for Reelin' In  The Years, The Miracles' "Definitive DVD" has been awarded Certified Gold status by the RIAA .

Track listing 

"Shop Around" (from Teen Town - February 1965)
"You've Really Got a Hold on Me/ Bring It On Home To Me" (from Motortown Revue at The Apollo - April 1963)<
"Mickey's Monkey (song)" (from Hollywood A Go-Go - November 20, 1965)
"Ooo Baby Baby" (from Murray The K - It's What's Happening, Baby - June 28, 1965)
"The Tracks of My Tears" (from Swingin' Time - December 8, 1965)
"Going to a Go-Go" (from Swingin' Time - December 8, 1965)
"My Girl Has Gone" (from Swingin' Time - December 8, 1965)
"I Second That Emotion" (from The Mike Douglas Show - February 29, 1968) 
"The Tears of a Clown" (from The Don Knotts Show - October 20, 1970)
"Do It Baby" (from Dinah! - March 11, 1976)
"Love Machine" (from Dinah! - March 11, 1976)
"Crusin'" (from Going Platinum - 1980)
"Being With You" (from the Don Lane Show - October 19, 1981)
"Just to See Her" (from Power Hits - 1987)
Note : the foreign release of this DVD includes an extra track not included in the U.S. release: "Yesterday" from The Ed Sullivan Show-1968. Miracles member Marv Tarplin is featured prominently in this performance. 
All tracks have been remastered for this release.

Personnel  
Smokey Robinson
Bobby Rogers
Claudette Rogers Robinson
Ronald White
Pete Moore
Billy Griffin
Marv Tarplin

References

External links
Reelin' in the Years

The Miracles video albums
Live video albums
2006 video albums
2006 live albums
Motown live albums
Motown video albums
The Miracles live albums
The Miracles